The 2009–10 Missouri Tigers women's basketball team represented the University of Missouri in the 2009–10 NCAA Division I women's basketball season. The Tigers competed in the Big 12 conference.

Offseason
 April 17: Sydney Crafton signed a National Letter of Intent to play for the Missouri women's basketball team. Crafton joins Trenee Thornton of Kansas City as a member of the recruiting class. Crafton, playing at Jefferson City High School, averaged 18.1 ppg., 5.8 rpg., 2.7 apg. and 2.1 spg. as a senior for the Lady Jays. She reached double figures in 23 of 25 games as the school recorded an 18–8 record.

Regular season

Roster

Schedule

|-
!colspan=9| Exhibition
|-

|-
!colspan=9| Regular season

|-
!colspan=9| Phillips 66 Big 12 Championship

References

Missouri Tigers women's basketball seasons
Missouri
Missouri Tigers
Missouri Tigers